The Ross Gyre is one of the two gyres that exist within the Southern Ocean. The gyre is located in the Ross Sea, and rotates clockwise. The gyre is formed by interactions between the Antarctic Circumpolar Current and the Antarctic Continental Shelf. Sea ice has been noted to persist in the central area of the gyre.

There is some evidence that global warming has resulted in some decrease of the salinity of the waters of the Ross Gyre since the 1950s.

See also 
 Oceanic current
 Physical oceanography
 Weddell Gyre

References

Geography of the Southern Ocean
Oceanic gyres